The Grădiștea Muncelului-Cioclovina Natural Park is a protected area (natural park category V IUCN) situated in Romania, in Hunedoara County.

Location 
The Natural Park is located in the Şureanu Mountains (Southern Carpathians), in the central-southern part of Hunedoara county, in the administrative territory of communes Baru, Boșorod, Bănița, Orăştioara de Sus and Pui.

Description 
Grădiștea Muncelului-Cioclovina Natural Park has an area of 38.184 ha, and was declared a natural protected area by the Law Number 5 on March 6, 2000 (published in Romanian Official Paper Number 152 on April 12, 2000) and represents a mountainous area which includes forests, mountain peaks, pastures, meadows, valleys, karst areas, caves, canyons; what shelters variety of flora and fauna. 

Protected areas included in the park: Ponorâci-Cioclovina Karstic Complex (1,50 ha), Tecuri Cave (2 ha), Șura Mare Cave (5 ha), Bolii Cave (0,50 ha), Crivadia Canyon (10 ha) and Fossil Reserve Ohaba-Ponor (10 ha).

References 

Protected areas of Romania
Geography of Hunedoara County
Protected areas established in 2000
Tourist attractions in Hunedoara County